RAA or Raa may refer to:

RAA
 Ralph Appelbaum Associates, museum exhibition design firms
 Ramos Arizpe Assembly, a General Motors automobile factory in Ramos Arizpe, Coahuila, Mexico
 Reasoned action approach, a psychological theory to explain behavior
 Reciprocal Access Agreement, a bilateral defense and security pact between Australia and Japan
 Recreation and Amusement Association, a system of brothels set up by the Japanese government for US occupation forces
 Recreational Aviation Australia, governing body for ultralights in Australia
 Reductio ad absurdum, a style of logical argument or formal rule inference
 Reeve Aleutian Airways, an airline headquartered in Anchorage, Alaska
 Regional Airline Association
 Requiem: Avenging Angel, a 1999 first-person shooter video game
 Research on Armenian Architecture
Resource acquisition ability, a term in social psychology.
 Right atrial appendage
 Royal Artillery Association, an association of serving or former Royal Regiment of Artillery soldiers
 Royal Australian Artillery, a corps in the Australian Army
 Royal Automobile Association, of South Australia, also known as RAA
 Ruby Application Archive
 The Rural Alberta Advantage, a Canadian indie band
 , the Swedish National Heritage Board
 Renin-angiotensin-aldosterone system, another name for the renin–angiotensin system

Raa
 Raa (film), a 2001 Telugu film
 Raa (surname)
 Raa Atoll, an administrative division of the Maldives
 Raa, the fourth consonant of the Thaana abugaida used in Dhivehi